Wilson's School is a state boys' grammar school with academy status in the London Borough of Sutton, England.  

It was founded as Wilson's Grammar School in Camberwell in 1615, making it one of the country's oldest state schools. The school moved to its present location on part of the site of the former Croydon Airport in 1975. It became voluntary aided in 1997 and an Academy in June 2011.

In 2015, the school celebrated its 400th anniversary with a visit from Prince Edward.

Academics 
GCSE and A level results consistently place Wilson's School amongst the highest performing schools in the United Kingdom.

Wilson's was awarded "London State Secondary School of the Decade" by The Times in 2020.

In 2019, The Telegraph ranked Wilson's the 4th highest performing school nationally for GCSE results.

In November 2018, The Times School Guide declared Wilson's the "State Secondary School of the Year".

In 2017, The Times listed Wilson's School as the highest performing 11-18 state school in the country for A-Level, as well as being the number 1 all boys' (state or private) school - the best set of results in the school's history.

The school's last Ofsted report (undertaken before the school converted to an academy) rated the school as Grade 1 (outstanding) in all 38 of the target areas.

History

Foundation 

The school was founded by Edward Wilson in 1615 and was located in Camberwell, now part of Greater London but at that time a small village of cottages, homesteads, inns and larger buildings grouped around a village green. Wilson was born around 1550 in Cartmel, Lancashire, which had its own grammar school, from where he passed on to Cambridge University. No record remains of him taking a degree, although it is known that he went into the Church, being appointed Deacon at Ely in Norfolk in 1576. He subsequently became Vicar of the Parish of Camberwell, which was presented to him by Queen Elizabeth I in person. This would indicate that he favoured the settlement of the Church of England, which the Queen was resolved to make. His nephew Peter Danson became a governor of the new school at its founding. Danson was also vicar of Carshalton in Surrey, only one mile from the present site of the school. A further member of the Wilson family, a namesake of Edward Wilson, is named in the charter of the school as the Master.

After his wife died, and having had no children, he decided to set up a school using his available resources to create a legacy- saying in the royal charter that for all time there would be a school in Camberwell named after him. At the time, the establishment of a grammar school in England required the assent of the crown. This was obtained after the first school buildings were constructed. The original charter bearing this assent has since been lost, although in 1929 the governors of the school obtained a certified extract from the Patent Rolls. This requirement for the agreement of the Crown explains the legend "Founded in 1615 by Royal Charter" that appears in various places beneath the school name. The charter was granted by King James I, who had succeeded his cousin Elizabeth by this time.

The charter names the school as "The Free Grammar School of Edward Wilson, clerk, in Camberwell, otherwise Camerwell, in the County of Surrey."

Reconstitution 

In 1845 the school was forced to close as a result of a financial scandal. This was the result of Governor James Goulston, who sued the school. Following an Order in Council of Queen Victoria in 1880, which superseded the previous Royal Charter, the school was rebuilt on a different site in Camberwell, opening in 1883. It again catered to the need for schooling of boys in Camberwell, which by this time had grown considerably from its rustic origins. Its working population largely consisted of men working in the professions, clerks, journalists, tradesmen and labourers. Naturally, a grammar school provided an asset to the neighbourhood, with the prospect for boys to go on to University education.
For five and a half years during the Second World War, Wilson's was evacuated to a Camp School at Itchingfield near Horsham, Sussex, and for the only period in its history became a boarding school. The whole compound stood around a broad elliptical area, set in large part to grass and the remainder, an asphalt quadrangle. Radiating from this central area, in spoke-like fashion, was a series of large cedarwood huts. These were the dormitories, ablution blocks and classrooms. Two larger buildings stood adjacent to the asphalted space, one the dining hall and the other the assembly hall which also functioned as the gym, cinema and church. The whole establishment catered for four hundred plus boys forming six houses, all named after past headmasters of the school, Nairn, Macdowell, Wilson, Kelly, Whiteley and Jephson. The Head Master of Christ's Hospital was kind enough to allow Wilson's the use of the school's cricket pitches, swimming bath and other facilities, including the Great Hall for Speech Day.

In 1958, an elementary school in Camberwell known as the Greencoat School was closed after a 250-year history and part of its assets passed to Wilson's Grammar School. The funds were used to provide a new science facility, the Greencoat Building, which was constructed opposite the main school site in Wilson Road. Two carved figures of a boy and a girl which are believed to have stood over the boys' and girls' entrances to the school were installed first in the Greencoat Building, and later in the Greencoat Courtyard in the new school at Wallington.

While information on pupils taught at the school before 1843 has been lost, Wilson's has a long list of noted Old Boys across the fields of entertainment, science, the military and the church. A Short History of Wilson's School, from which much of the information below was taken, was first published in 1951; its most recent edition was in 1987.

Relocation 
In 1975 the school moved to the current site. A three part plan for expansion only saw part one carried out, though subsequent construction has occurred such as the building of additional science blocks, the Sixth Form Centre, the Foundation Building, the Venner Building (for Art and Design), the Mary Datchelor Wing
(housing the Music Department) and the Lower School (to accommodate Year 7 and 8 teaching).

Controversy 
In 2019, former headmaster Damien Charnock was arrested in Singapore on various drug charges and was subsequently jailed for 10 months.

School Coat of Arms and Badge 

From 1883 the school was accustomed to use as a coat of arms the version of the Wilson shield used by Edward Wilson, probably without authority. In 1985 the then Chairman of Governors, Lt. Col. W. R. Bowden, obtained a Grant of Arms from the College of Arms. The new officially authorised Arms introduced to the previous form a silver bar between the wolf and the objects above, together with a gold border. Additionally, a crest is added above the helm in the form of a black wolf holding a silver fleur-de-lys in his paws with a black and gold mantle.

Houses 
Each pupil is allocated to one of the houses upon entry to the school. In 1981, four new houses (Brecon, Camberwell, Greencoat and Hayes) replaced the previous six (Jephson, Kelly, McDowell, Nairne, Whiteley, Wilson). Southwark was added in 2002, when the school became five form entry. In 2014, the six house structure was restored with the advent of Datchelor. Students in the same year in the same house are in the same form, and have registration, form period and lessons in Years 7 and 8 together. Between Year 9 and 11, forms are split in two each with their own form tutors. From Year 9, students no longer have lessons exclusively with members of their forms. All members of the staff are allocated to Houses. Three of the houses (Brecon, Camberwell and Datchelor) learn German, while the other three houses (Greencoat, Hayes and Southwark) learn French.

Sport 

The school's main sport is association football. In 2007 the 1st XI won the U19 Surrey Cup but lost to Millfield School in the semi-finals of the National Championship.

Rugby union was first introduced to the school in 1886, although it has not been continuously played since then. It was revived in 1921, in the 1960s and 1980s, and has continued since a further revival in the mid-1990s. Rugby teams in all year groups compete against a range of local schools. The teams often participate in sevens tournaments. Wilson's has produced a number of Surrey players in the last few years, and has close contact with local clubs such as Sutton & Epsom and Warlingham.

With cricket there is a team for every year group up until Year 11 when there is a first, second and often a third team. The school competes against local schools on Saturdays and there is first team tour every two years.

Alongside cricket, athletics is also popular. During the summer term, the school partakes in many track and field events; these include 100 m to 1500 m races, hurdles, javelin, shot put, long jump, high jump, triple jump and discus.

The school was designated an Academy School by Badminton England in February 2006. The school is home for the Chadacre Badminton club.

The under-19s table tennis team are ranked fourth nationally, having won the Surrey Cup and the National Schools Area Tournament, and being runners up in the National Regional Tournament.

Combined Cadet Force 

Wilson's School CCF was established in 1910 as an Army Officer Training Corps on the original Camberwell site by a teacher, Captain Edmonds. It continued to flourish after the school's move to Wallington, and is now a Combined Cadet Force with Army and RAF sections, the latter introduced in 1964. The corps is inspected every two years and is regularly appraised at a standard well above the average for school CCFs.

In each year since 2011, members of the RAF Section have reached the National Final of the Royal Air Squadron Trophy Competition (RASTC) and in 2016 gained second place overall followed by a victory in 2017. The team won the National Final for a second time in 2019. In 2022, members of the RAF Section’s RASTC team reached national finals, and won the Royal Air Squadron Trophy Competition once again.

Old Boys 

Class lists from 1615 to 1843 have been lost, making it impossible to record with absolute certainty those who rose to fame in that period. However, A Short History notes that James Tyrrell, grandson of Archbishop Usher and author of A General History of England and other works, is known to have been a pupil in the middle of the seventeenth century.

Entertainment and sport 
 Tom Abbott, presenter and commentator for US television network The Golf Channel
 Sir Michael Caine (formerly Maurice Joseph Micklewhite), actor. Caine wrote of his dislike of his time at Wilson's, which was still in Camberwell during that period, in his autobiography What's It All About? However, he also states that his English teacher, Eric Watson "took the trouble to guide my rebellious mind into the area of literature."
 Jack Elliott, professional footballer
 Simon Furman, comic book writer
 Stephen Jenkins, stage name Stephen Beckett, actor with regular roles in Coronation Street and The Bill
 Andrew Kazamia, actor with a regular role in London's Burning, playwright and film-maker
 Glenn Moore, comedian
 Andy Scott, professional footballer and manager

Arts, humanities and politics 
 Pascal Anson, artist and designer
 Colin Butts, writer, Is Harry on the Boat? and White Island
 John Galliano, CBE, RDI, fashion designer
 Harry Golombek, OBE, Chess Grandmaster
 Aaron Porter, President, National Union of Students, 2010–11
 Roy Porter, historian
 Sir Norman Reid, former director of the Tate Gallery
 Mark Stone, opera singer
 Matthew Todd, editor of Attitude Magazine and playwright

Military 
 Capt. Harold Auten, VC, DSC, RD, "Q-Ship" commander in the First World War, author of ""Q" Boat Adventures" and later executive Vice-President of the Rank Organisation
 Sir Alan Cobham, KBE, AFC, pioneer aviator (first flight from Britain to Australia in 1926 and pioneer of air-to-air refuelling). Curiously, his flight to Australia was from Croydon Airport, the site of which is the present location of the school.

Science 
 Sir Lewis Fermor, OBE DSc FRS
 John Stevens Henslow, botanist and geologist
 Sir James Jeans, OM MA DSc ScD, astronomer
 George Barker Jeffery, mathematician

Industry and government 
 The 13th Earl of Cavan
 Ernest Partridge, MP and industrialist

Church 
 The Very Revd. Dr Walter Robert Matthews, CH, KCVO, DD, DLitt, former Dean of St Paul's Cathedral

Governors 
An exhaustive list is to be found in Appendix A of "A Short History of Wilson's School". The following are particular highlights from this. Dates are of their governorships.

 Hugh Boulter, DD, 1708–1722, Chaplain to George I, Bishop of Bristol, Archbishop of Armagh (Church of Ireland)
 Rev. Dr. George D'Oyly, 1820–1846, theologian, biographer and the main founder of King's College London
 Edmund Gibson, DD, 1703–1717, Bishop of Lincoln and later bishop of London
 George Hooper, DD, 1675–1703, Bishop of St Asaph, later bishop of Bath and Wells. Chaplain to Charles II and Regius Professor of Divinity at Oxford University
 William Dalrymple Maclagan, 1869–1875, Rector of Newington and later Archbishop of York, author of hymns

References

External links 
 
The Old Wilsonians' Association
Wilson's Alumni

Boys' schools in London
Grammar schools in the London Borough of Sutton
1615 establishments in England
Educational institutions established in the 1610s
Eco-Schools
Academies in the London Borough of Sutton
Schools with a royal charter